Diuris cuneata is a species of orchid whose name is accepted by the World Checklist of Selected Plant Families at the Royal Botanic Gardens, Kew but regarded as a synonym of Diuris dendrobioides by Australian authorities. It was first formally described in 1888 by Robert D. FitzGerald from a specimen collected near Cootamundra by Walter Scott Campbell and the description was published in Fitgerald's book Australian Orchids.

References

cuneata
Orchids of New South Wales
Flora of New South Wales
Flora of Victoria (Australia)
Plants described in 1888